is an arcade game created in 1999 by Konami. The game puts the player in the shoes of a sniper during a series of terrorist incidents. It is the first in the Silent Scope series.

Plot
The U.S. First Family, including the President of the United States, returns from a function in Chicago, Illinois when their convoy is ambushed by terrorists. In the resulting confusion, the terrorists manage to capture the entire First Family, and are demanding the release of their leader (the dictator) in exchange for the safe return of the president. Washington officials have decided to resolve the problem quietly, using military force.

The player assists police at the scene of the kidnapping, from several high rise structures and after making a choice on tactics, the player defeats one of the terrorist leaders and manages to rescue the president's daughter in the process. Next the player pursues a terrorist boss in order to safely rescue the President's Wife. Finally, the player makes an invasive entry into the terrorist base. After fighting through the heavily guarded mansion, the player defeats Monica and liberates the President himself. However, the dictator is making a getaway and the player exhausts nearly an entire magazine on bulletproof glass and has only one bullet left to eliminate the dictator.

Gameplay
The game uses a rifle that is mounted on the console, requiring players to physically alter their position in order to shoot accurately. In addition, the rifle's scope displays a close-up view of a small portion of the screen, representing the sniper's long-range view of the area where the rifle is pointed. Certain stage areas are dark and require players to use night vision scopes to spot and shoot opponents. The player can fire five shots in succession before reloading is required.

Players have limited time and health during gameplay. The time can be extended by killing certain enemies and extra health can be gained by finding and scoping an attractive woman in addition to bonus points. The game consists of three stages corresponding with the members of the First Family. In each stage, the player(s) must kill as many enemies as possible in short time facing sub bosses along the way and a large boss at the end. Unless a precise, lethal head shot is made, it will take more than one bullet to kill a sub-boss or boss. Enemies can shoot the player if they are not killed fast enough. Players must take care not to shoot innocent civilians in the crossfire. During game stages the player is able to choose one of two (easy, hard) or three (easy, medium or hard) paths to progress, facing a different boss and doing a different following mission depending on the choice made.

Points are scored based on where an opponent is hit, multiplied by the number of successful shots the player has made. In arcade mode, the best points are given for headshots, but on the practice range, bonus points are obtained for shooting the human shaped targets' guns.

The home versions have a cheat code where one can exchange life for time and vice versa. There are also secret codes for all versions that will make the game more difficult, such as hiding target indicators on enemies.

Reception

The Dreamcast, PlayStation 2 and Game Boy Advance versions of Silent Scope received "mixed or average reviews" according to the review aggregation website Metacritic. Brett Alan Weiss of AllGame said the arcade version was "a blast to play, though a few more realistic sniper missions would be nice. Graphics are acceptable with decent animation, but the music is indiscernible during the action. The voice acting is unintentionally hilarious." Larry "Major Mike" Hryb of GamePro said of the PlayStation 2 version, "In a field devoid of competition, Silent Scope is a strong first-generation offering and a picture-perfect arcade conversion. While a debatable purchase, Scope easily qualifies as a must-rent title." Edge gave the Dreamcast version a score of seven out of ten, saying that "it won't take most players long to complete the game, but Silent Scope is all about high scores through high accuracy. That's what Konami needed to port the consoles, and the one shot, one kill moments moments of euphoria and despar crystallise this as a success." Randy Nelson of NextGen said of the PS2 version, "It's not groundbreaking, but it's a solid shooting game with unique play mechanics." In Japan, Famitsu gave the GBA version a score of 23 out of 40.

Also in Japan, Game Machine listed the arcade version in their September 1, 1999 issue as the second most-successful dedicated arcade game of the month.

Notes

References

External links

1999 video games
Arcade video games
Dreamcast games
Game Boy Advance games
IOS games
Konami games
Light gun games
Mobile games
Now Production games
PlayStation 2 games
Rail shooters
Sniper video games
Video games about terrorism
Konami arcade games
Video games developed in Japan
Multiplayer and single-player video games